Sarah Purcell (born Sarah Pentecost on October 8, 1948, Richmond, Indiana) is an American former talk show host, game show host, and panelist.

She was co-host of The Better Sex (1977–1978), Real People (1979–1984), America (1985–1986), and ABC's Home (1992–1994) and made guest appearances on several TV dramas. She also co-starred in the 1981 TV movie Terror Among Us with Don Meredith and Tracy Reed. She has appeared in a number of infomercials for health foods, appliances, and skin care products.

From 1975 to 1978, she co-hosted A.M. Los Angeles on KABC-TV with Regis Philbin. In the early 1990s, Purcell was also a panelist on the game show To Tell the Truth.

References

External links 

1948 births
20th-century American actresses
Living people
American television talk show hosts
American game show hosts
Television anchors from Los Angeles
People from Richmond, Indiana
Television anchors from San Diego